Michael Harvey  (10 May 1694 – 3 October 1748), of Coombe, Surrey. and Clifton Maybank, near Milborne Port, Dorset was a British landowner and Tory politician who sat in the House of Commons between 1717 and 1747.

Harvey was the only surviving son of Edward Harvey of Coombe and his first wife  He married after a  settlement dated 23 April 1715, Rebecca Wolstenholme, daughter of Sir John Wolstenholme, 3rd Baronet, MP, of Edmonton, Middlesex. He inherited the Clifton Maybank estates from the widow of his cousin,  Michael Harvey MP, in 1717.

Harvey, was initially declared elected as Tory  Member of Parliament for Milborne Port  at a by-election of 10 June 1717,  but after considering a petition alleging gross bribery the House of Commons overturned the result and on 6 July 1717 his opponent was declared elected instead. He was returned unopposed at the 1722 general election  but faced contests in subsequent elections which he won in 1727 and 1734  but was defeated in the 1741 general election. He was returned for Milborne Port again at a by election on 2 February 1742.

Although Harvey succeeded to his father’s estate in 1736, he was financially ruined by the successive contests at Milborne Port. In 1743 a private Act was passed which vested his Leicestershire estates in trustees in order to  discharge encumbrances on the estates in Surrey. He also had to mortgage his Clifton Maybank estate and property at Milborne Port, putting them into the hands of Peter Walter who was notorious for his property dealings. At the 1747 general election, Harvey was involved in a double return at Milborne Port and his opponents were declared elected. The validity of the election was referred by the House to the elections committee. By 1748, Peter Walter had foreclosed on his Clifton Maybank and Milborne Port properties.

Harvey died of apoplexy on 3 October 1748, before the elections committee reported on the last election. He had no children and  his Surrey estates were sold.

References

1694 births
1748 deaths
Members of the Parliament of Great Britain for Milborne Port
British MPs 1715–1722
British MPs 1722–1727
British MPs 1727–1734
British MPs 1734–1741
British MPs 1741–1747